Group C of the EuroBasket Women 2021 took place between 17 and 20 June 2021. The group consisted of Belgium, Bosnia and Herzegovina, Slovenia and Turkey and played its games at the Rhénus Sport in Strasbourg, France.

Teams

Standings

Matches
All times are local (UTC+2).

Bosnia and Herzegovina vs Belgium

Slovenia vs Turkey

Turkey vs Bosnia and Herzegovina

Belgium vs Slovenia

Bosnia and Herzegovina vs Slovenia

Turkey vs Belgium

References

External links
Official website

Group C
2020–21 in Belgian basketball
2020–21 in Slovenian basketball
2020–21 in Turkish basketball